State Trunk Highway 21 (often called Highway 21, STH-21 or WIS 21) is a state highway in the U.S. state of Wisconsin. It runs east–west across the center of the state between Sparta and Oshkosh. The route often serves as a direct route for travelers between Appleton and Oshkosh to Tomah and La Crosse.  It is a two-lane surface road for nearly all of its length, with the exception of a few urban arterials of four or more lanes. The section of WIS 21 between Fort McCoy and I-94 in Tomah is classified as a  "Major STRAHNET Connector." while the route past I-94 is classified as a "Non-Interstate STRAHNET Route"

Route description 
WIS 21 begins at the intersection of WIS 16, WIS 71 and WIS 27 The route then follows WIS 16 and WIS 71 east for about one half of a mile before turning north off the concurrency. WIS 21 proceeds northeast, following the La Crosse River and passes through Fort McCoy. The route then turns eastward and follows alongside the Tarr and Sparta Creeks, passing through Tunnel City. WIS 21 crosses US 12 and I-94 on the north side of Tomah. The route continues east from there to junction with WIS 173 west of Wyeville and then crosses into Juneau County. WIS 21 passes through the Necedah National Wildlife Refuge during its twelve-mile (19 km) stretch of straight route to Necedah. WIS 21 enters Adams County at the river, just south of Petenwell Lake. WIS 21 junctions with WIS 13 three miles (5 km) north of Friendship. The route also provides indirect access to Roche-a-Cri State Park via WIS 13. 

WIS 21 crosses I-39 and US 51 at Coloma in Waushara County. The route passes through the village just east of the Interstate. After passing through Richford at CTH B, WIS 21 gradually curves northward to junction with CTH Y - where it turns sharply eastward and junctions with WIS 22 and WIS 73 north in Wautoma. WIS 21 follows WIS 73 south for two miles (3 km) before turning east again of the concurrency near Silver Lake. WIS 152 junctions with the routes about two miles (3 km) northwest of the eastern concurrency terminus. The highway passes through Lohrville and Redgranite and junctions with WIS 49 south of Auroraville. 

WIS 21 enters Winnebago County five miles (8 km) east of WIS 49. WIS 21 crosses WIS 116 in Omro. The route then enters the greater Oshkosh area and junctions with US 41 along Omro Road. WIS 21 continues along Omro Road, Oshkosh Avenue and Congress Avenue, ending at US 45 (Algoma Boulevard) on the northwest side of Oshkosh after crossing the upper Fox River east of Lake Butte des Morts.

History 
The route was first written into law in from La Crosse to Oshkosh. The highway passed through Sparta, but through the south side of Tomah and New Lisbon before turning north to Necedah. After crossing the Wisconsin River, WIS 21 followed WIS 13 into Adams and Friendship. Both routes followed a different right-of-way at the time. WIS 21 then returned to the present corridor route to pass through Coloma, Wautoma, Omro and into Oshkosh. The route from La Crosse to New Lisbon was removed in the early 1920s and extended along its current alignment through Wyeville to North Tomah. The highway was rerouted in Adams County to become more direct between Arkdale and CTH-G in 1939. The western extension past Fort McCoy into Sparta was added in 1947.

Major intersections

See also

References

External links

021
Transportation in Monroe County, Wisconsin
Transportation in Juneau County, Wisconsin
Transportation in Adams County, Wisconsin
Transportation in Waushara County, Wisconsin
Transportation in Winnebago County, Wisconsin